Pullela is an Indian surname. Notable people with the surname include:

 Pullela Gopichand (born 1973), Indian badminton player
 Pullella Sriramachandrudu (1927–2015), Indian scholar

Indian surnames